Since its founding in 2005, the video-sharing website YouTube has been faced with a growing number of privacy issues, including allegations that it allows users to upload unauthorized copyrighted material and allows personal information from young children to be collected without their parents' consent.

Early history (2005–2010) 
In 2008, Viacom sued YouTube, demanding $1 billion in damages, said that it had found more than 150,000 unauthorized clips of its material on YouTube that had been viewed "an astounding 1.5 billion times". YouTube responded by stating that it "goes far beyond its legal obligations in assisting content owners to protect their works".

During the same court battle, Viacom won a court ruling requiring YouTube to hand over 12 terabytes of data detailing the viewing habits of every user who has watched videos on the site. The decision was criticized by the Electronic Frontier Foundation, which called the court ruling "a setback to privacy rights".

COPPA settlement 
In April 2018, a coalition of 23 groups (including the CCFC, CDD, and Common Sense Media) filed a complaint with the Federal Trade Commission, alleging that YouTube collected information from users under the age of 13 without parental consent, in violation of the Children's Online Privacy Protection Act (COPPA).

In September 2019, YouTube was fined $170 million by the FTC for collecting personal information from minors under the age of 13 (in particular, viewing history) without parental consent, in order to allow channel operators to serve targeted advertising on their videos. In particular, the FTC ruled that YouTube was partly liable under COPPA, as the service's rating and curation of content as being suitable for children constituted the targeting of the website towards children. In order to comply with the settlement, YouTube was ordered to "develop, implement, and maintain a system for Channel Owners to designate whether their Content on the YouTube Service is directed to Children." YouTube also announced that it would invest $100 million over the next three years to support the creation of "thoughtful, original children's content".

YouTube began to implement its compliance approach in November 2019, in line with its settlement with the FTC. All channels are required to declare if their content is "made for kids", either as a blanket claim for their entire channel, or on a per-video basis. The company stated that a video was considered "made for kids" if its primary audience was children, or was "directed" to children based on various factors as guidelines (even if they are not the primary audience), including use of child actors, "characters, celebrities, or toys that appeal to children", depictions of "activities that appeal to children, such as play-acting, simple songs or games, or early education", and poems, songs, and stories intended for children, among others. YouTube would employ machine learning to find videos that they believed were clearly "made for kids" and automatically mark them as such, but would not help or advise content creators for videos that fall into unclear categories, as this constituted legal advice.  Liability for failing proper marking channels or videos as "made for kids" would fall onto the channel owners, with the FTC being able to issue up to $42,000 fines per infringing video, though the FTC clarified that the amount would be based on "a company's financial condition and the impact a penalty could have on its ability to stay in business".

Beginning in January 2020, videos marked as being "made for kids" carry restricted functionality in order to prevent data collection from minors: social and community features such as end screens and other widgets, notification functions, and comments are disabled, and videos can only be monetized with contextual advertising based on the video's metadata.

The new policies have faced criticism, with some channel owners having considered YouTube and the FTC's guidance to be unclear in certain edge cases, such as video gaming (where content may typically be directed towards teens and young adults, but may still contain characters that appeal to children). They also noted that according to YouTube, a lack of targeted ads could reduce a video's revenue, and that the lack of social features might impact the ability for their videos to receive promotion. Videos marked as "made for kids" were also excluded from Google search engine results, further lowering revenue for content creators. Content creators who were unsure of whether their content was "made for kids" argued they would either need to preemptively mark their videos as such or make their videos private, or otherwise would be at risk of being fined by the FTC.

The legal language of COPPA offered the ability for content to be marked for "mixed audience", which would allow for data collection from the viewers once the viewer had identified themselves of being 13 years or older. YouTube's decision not to include a "mixed audience" as a third option has been criticized, since this option would alleviate content creator concerns. YouTube had stated in their information page related to the COPPA requirements that "there are some complexities with the mixed audience category" which they have submitted to the FTC during public comment periods, and in the interim "decided to streamline the options for creators by creating a single 'Made for kids' category to avoid further confusion in an already unclear space."

FTC commissioner Rebecca Kelly Slaughter noted in dissenting remarks that many of the child-directed channels on YouTube were run by owners outside of the U.S., which may fall outside the jurisdiction of COPPA and the FTC's "practical reach". The FTC issued a blog post on November 22, 2019, to clarify what it considered "made for kids" and that several factors will be used to make this determination, and that it recognized that some types of content, like animated programming, can appeal to all ages and would not immediately become subject to COPPA's requirements. The FTC also directed creators to its original complaint against YouTube, identifying channels and video content that they considered to be under COPPA that was the basis of their case.

On December 10, 2019, citing the aforementioned criticism, YouTube filed comments with the FTC requesting clarity on its rules, citing the aforementioned edge cases. YouTube started treating all videos designated as "made for kids" as liable under COPPA on January 6, 2020, which resulted in videos that contain drugs, profanity, sexual content, and violence (in addition to age-restricted videos) also being affected, despite YouTube claiming that such content is "likely not made for kids".

See also 

 Privacy concerns regarding Google

References 

YouTube
YouTube controversies
Internet privacy
Privacy controversies and disputes
Criticism of Google